The Singapore Classic is a professional golf tournament played on the European Tour, held at Laguna National Golf & Country Club, in Singapore.

The tournament was announced in June 2022 and was the first time that the European Tour has visited Singapore since the 2014 Championship at Laguna National, played at the same venue.

Ockie Strydom won the inaugural event, shooting a final-round 63 to beat Sami Välimäki by one shot.

Controversy
The inaugural staging of the tournament created mild controversy as it was the first time that the European Tour had staged a tournament in the Southeast Asian region without co-sanctioning the event with the Asian Tour. This was mainly due to the European Tour and Asian Tour's partnership having ended due to the European Tour siding with the PGA Tour, and the Asian Tour siding with LIV Golf.

Winners

References

External links
Coverage on European Tour official site

European Tour events
Golf tournaments in Singapore